Claes Mattias Vepsä (born 2 February 1980 in Kista, Stockholm) is a Swedish Social Democratic politician and Member of Parliament since 2017. He serves as an alternate in Minister for Energy and Digital Development Anders Ygeman's stead and represents Stockholm Municipality. 
After Thomas Hammarberg resigned from the Riksdag 31 January 2022, from 1 February 2022 Vepsä is assigned his seat and is an ordinary Member of Parliament.

References 

  
Footnotes

1980 births
Living people
Politicians from Stockholm
Members of the Riksdag from the Social Democrats
21st-century Swedish politicians
Members of the Riksdag 2014–2018
Members of the Riksdag 2018–2022
Members of the Riksdag 2022–2026